Yaaran Naal Baharan  is a Punjabi feature film, released in 2005. It stars Jimmy Sheirgill in the lead role with Juhi Babbar, and was directed by Manmohan Singh.

Plot 
This film tells a story of young hearts seeing each other and falling in love; this falling in love makes their life so different and beautiful. It shows the college life of students, their hostel life, the way they enjoy themselves in the college and the hard work they put in for their studies.
Fellow students of Punjab University, Navdeep Singh and Harman Kaur, fall in love with each other. Both start to dream of a happy life together. But problems arise when they think of taking their parent's consent before going any further. Harman's father Col. Thakur Singh is a typical Punjabi father with a big ego who does not appreciate the idea of his daughter selecting a groom herself. Deep's Father, Retired Major Balwinder Singh Brar, also opposes this alliance, and wants his son to complete his studies before getting married. Balwinder subsequently changes his mind but wants Thakur to adapt to tradition and approach him – but Thakur refuses to do so. The couple then conspire with their fellow students and arrange for their parents to meet on neutral ground. It is this decision that will shatter and change their lives forever.
Now both Navdeep and Harmaan are in a dilemma: neither can they go against their parents, nor can they live without each other. How they convince their parents about their relationship without hurting their sentiments is the rest of the story.

Cast
Jimmy Shergill as Navdeep 'Deep' Singh Brar
Juhi Babbar as Harman Kaur
Raj Babbar as Retd. Major Balwinder J. Brar (Deep's Father)
Sunita Dhir as Balwinder's Wife (Deep's Mother)
Anupam Kher as Retd. Col. Thakur Singh (Harman's Father)
Ketki Dave as Geeta – Thakur's Wife (Harman's Mother)
Naren as Pawan (Deep's Haryanvi Friend)
Sharhaan Singh as deep's friend (harry)
Gavie Chahal as Deep's Friend 
Sharhaan Singh as Deep's Friend
Prabhleen Sandhu as Harman's friend
Rupi Kamboj as Jeeti Kaur – Deep's sister
Sonika Gill as Mandeep Kaur 'Mini'
Gurpreet Ghuggi as Rangila
Vivek Shauq as Ghinda Mann 
Sudeepa Singh as Harman's friend

Soundtrack

References

External links 
 

Films distributed by Yash Raj Films
Punjabi-language Indian films
2000s Punjabi-language films
Films scored by Jaidev Kumar